New Zealand's largest Manganui River is a river of the Northland Region of New Zealand's North Island. The river's lower course is noted for its convoluted, winding path through low-lying swampy terrain, and several oxbow lakes are associated with this stretch of the river.

See also
List of rivers of New Zealand

References

Rivers of the Northland Region
Rivers of New Zealand
Kaipara Harbour catchment